Litz wire is a particular type of multistrand wire or cable used in electronics to carry alternating current (AC) at radio frequencies.  The wire is designed to reduce the skin effect and proximity effect losses in conductors used at frequencies up to about 1 MHz.  It consists of many thin wire strands, individually insulated and twisted or woven together, following one of several  carefully prescribed patterns often involving several levels (groups of twisted wires are twisted together, etc.). The result of these winding patterns is to equalize the proportion of the overall length over which each strand is at the outside of the conductor.  This has the effect of distributing the current equally among the wire strands, reducing the resistance.   Litz wire is used in high Q inductors for radio transmitters and receivers operating at low frequencies, induction heating equipment and switching power supplies.

The term litz wire originates from Litzendraht (coll. Litze), German for braided/stranded wire or woven wire.

Principle of operation
Litz wire reduces the increase in resistance of wire that takes place at higher frequencies due to two effects: skin effect and proximity effect.

Skin effect

The resistance of a conductor depends on its cross-sectional area; a conductor with a larger area has a lower resistance for a given length.   However at high frequencies, alternating current (AC) does not penetrate deeply into conductors due to eddy currents induced in the material; it tends to flow near the surface.  This is called skin effect.  Therefore in a solid conductor like a wire, current tends to flow in a layer or annulus at the surface, and less current flows through the material near the center of the wire.  Since less of the cross-sectional area of the wire is being used, the resistance of the wire is greater than it is for direct current (DC).  The higher the frequency of the current, the smaller the depth to which the current penetrates, and the current is "crowded" into an increasingly smaller cross-sectional area along the surface, so the AC resistance of wire increases with frequency.  

The depth to which AC current penetrates in a conductor is determined by a parameter called the skin depth, which is the depth at which the current is reduced to 1/e ≈ 37% of its surface value.  The skin depth decreases with frequency.  At low frequencies at which the skin depth is larger than the diameter of the wire, the skin effect is negligible and the current distribution and resistance are virtually the same as at DC.  As the frequency rises and the skin depth gets smaller than the wire diameter, skin effect becomes significant, the current is increasingly concentrated near the surface, and the resistance per unit length of wire increases above its DC value.  Examples of skin depth in copper wire at different frequencies 
Round conductors such as wire or cables larger than a few skin depths do not conduct much current near their axis, so the metal located at the central part of the wire is not used effectively.

Proximity effect

In applications where multiple wires carrying the same current lie side-by-side, such as in inductor and transformer windings, a second similar effect called proximity effect causes additional current crowding, resulting in an additional increase in the resistance of the wire with frequency.  In two wires running parallel next to each other, with the same alternating current flowing in both wires, the magnetic field of the adjacent wire induces longitudinal eddy currents in the wire which causes the current to be concentrated in a narrow strip on the side adjacent to the other wire.  This has a similar effect as the skin effect; the current is crowded into a smaller cross-sectional area of the wire, so the resistance increases.

How Litz wire works
One technique to reduce the resistance is to place more of the conductive material near the surface where the current is by replacing the wire with a hollow copper tube.   The larger surface area of the tube conducts the current with much less resistance than a solid wire with the same cross-sectional area would.   The tank coils of high power radio transmitters are often made of copper tubing, silver plated on the outside, to reduce resistance.  However tubing is not flexible and requires special tools to bend and shape. 

Litz wire is another method, which employs a stranded wire with individually insulated conductors (forming a bundle). Each thin conductor is less than a skin-depth, so an individual strand does not suffer an appreciable skin effect loss. The strands must be insulated from each other—otherwise all the wires in the bundle would short together, behave like a single large wire, and still have skin effect problems. Furthermore, the strands cannot occupy the same radial position in the bundle over long distances: the electromagnetic effects that cause the skin effect would still disrupt conduction. The weaving or twisting pattern of the wires in the bundle is designed so that the individual strands are on the outside of the bundle for a distance (where the EM field changes are smaller and the strand sees low resistance), and are on the inside of the bundle for a distance (where the EM field changes are the strongest and the resistance is higher). If strands have a comparable impedance, current is distributed equally among every strand within the cable.  This allows the interior of the litz wire to contribute to the overall conductivity of the bundle.

Another way to explain the benefit of litz braiding is as follows: the magnetic fields generated by current flowing in the strands are in directions such that they have a reduced tendency to generate an opposing electromagnetic field in the other strands. Thereby, for the wire as a whole, the skin effect and associated power losses when used in high-frequency applications are reduced. The ratio of distributed inductance to distributed resistance is increased, relative to a solid conductor, resulting in a higher Q factor at these frequencies.

Effectiveness
 provides an expression for the ratio of resistance to alternating current to resistance to direct current for an isolated litz wire. It does not apply to windings with multiple turns.

Litz wire is very effective below 500 kHz; it is rarely used above 2 MHz as it is much less effective there. At frequencies above about 1 MHz, the benefits become gradually offset by the effect of parasitic capacitance between the strands. At microwave frequencies, the skin depth is much smaller than the diameter of the strands, and the current that is forced through the inner strands induces strong eddy currents in the outer strands, which negates the benefits of litz wire to the point where it performs much worse than solid wire of the same diameter.

Litz wire has a higher impedance per unit cross-sectional area but litz wires can be used at thicker cable sizes, hence reducing or maintaining cable impedance at higher frequencies.
Construction of litz wires usually involves extremely fine wires often available with a silver plate or solid silver. The individual strands often make use of a low temperature lacquer coating that typically requires silver solder iron temperatures to melt - which is removed when making connections. The bundles of wires can also use silk outer insulation.

Applications

Litz wire is used to make inductors and transformers, especially for high frequency applications where the skin effect is more pronounced and proximity effect can be an even more severe problem. Litz wire is one kind of stranded wire, but, in this case, the reason for its use is not the usual one of avoiding complete wire breakage due to material fatigue.

Litz wire is frequently found in power applications in frequencies ranging between lower tens to higher hundreds kilohertz, namely induction cookers and transmitters of inductive chargers (e.g. the Qi standard). Multiple parallel twisted strands of enameled wires can be found also in transformers in some switching power supplies.

WWVB transmitting station
NIST uses litz wire in the time code broadcasting station WWVB. The station transmits on 60 kHz. Litz wire is used for the helix and variometer in both helix houses. It consists of 9 × 5 × 5 × 27 (totaling 6075) strands of #36 AWG ( diameter) magnet wire and multiple layers of cotton, hemp, and plastic insulation, in a cable ¾ inch (19 mm) in diameter, totaling 151,875 circular mils of copper.

See also
 Tinsel wire

References

External links

Manfred Albach, Janina Patz, Hans Rossmanith, Dietmar Exner, Alexander Stadler: Optimized Winding = Optimum in Power Efficiency, Comparison of Losses in litz wires and round wires, The original text was released in the german magazine Elektronik Power, April 2010, Page 38-77
 NAA Cutler Maine - Navy VLF Transmitter Site: 2 MW, 14-24 kc. Naval transmitter uses 4-inch diameter Litz wire; picture of variometer.

Wire